The Unguarded Hour is a 1936 American drama film directed by Sam Wood and starring Loretta Young and Franchot Tone. In England, a prominent young prosecutor in a murder trial is unaware that his wife is involved.

It is based on Bernard Merivale's 1935 play The Unguarded Hour, an adaptation of an earlier Hungarian work by Ladislas Fodor. Some changes were made from the play in order to heighten the drama, including having the heroine as the elusive witness in connection with the trial. The film's set designs were overseen by Cedric Gibbons, assisted by Edwin B. Willis and Joseph Wright. Dolly Tree designed the costumes.

Plot
Barrister Sir Alan Dearden is tipped to be Britain's next and youngest ever Attorney General. Shortly before he leaves for holiday on the Continent, his wife Helen is approached by a man claiming to have love letters written by her husband to his own estranged wife. Although these pre-date their marriage, Lady Helen worries that scandal would ruin her husband's career and reluctantly agrees to pay the blackmail demand of £2,000. The following day, she draws the money out of the bank and meets the blackmailer in Dover, eventually leaving the money on the White Cliffs. While she is recovering the love letters, she sees a middle-aged man warning his wife not to go too near the edge.

She is enjoying her holiday with her husband when he is urgently called back to London to take over a murder case at the Old Bailey. A man named Metford stands accused of pushing his wife over a cliff. A shocked Helen realises that she is the key witness in the case but elects to remain silent. During cross-examination, Dearden hounds Metford over his claims that there was a female witness who saw him warning his wife to take care by pointing out a nationwide hunt has not produced this supposed witness. Helen does what she can to persuade her husband that Metford is innocent and that people often make poor witnesses when they are telling the truth, but he is unmoved.

Then, during the trial, Dearden is approached by his former flame —- encouraged by her estranged husband —- who demands blackmail money from him. When shortly afterwards she is found murdered, Scotland Yard investigate and find suspicion is pointed at Dearden. While he has a genuine excuse of how she spent the "unguarded hour", his story sounds as unbelievable as Metford's.

In a sensational development, Lady Helen is subpoenaed by the defence in order to clear the accused, which she does. She then manages to entrap the original blackmailer into revealing that he was the man who killed Metford’s wife.

Cast
Loretta Young as Lady Helen Dudley Dearden
Franchot Tone as Sir Alan Dearden
Lewis Stone as General Lawrence
Roland Young as William 'Bunny' Jeffers
Jessie Ralph as Lady Agatha Hathaway
Dudley Digges as Samuel Metford
Henry Daniell as Hugh Lewis
Robert Greig as Henderson
E. E. Clive as Lord Henry Hathaway
Wallis Clark as Inspector Grainger
John Buckler as Defense Counsel
Aileen Pringle as Diana Roggers
 Ottola Nesmith as Mrs. Samuel Metford
 Viva Tattersall as Eloise Cameron 
 Crauford Kent as Inspector Thorpe 
 Leonard Carey as Hilton - Alan's Assistant
 C. Montague Shaw as Registrar 
 Lawrence Grant as Judge
 Guy Bellis as Attorney in Court

Radio adaptation
The Unguarded Hour was presented on Theatre Guild on the Air December 28, 1952. The one-hour adaptation starred Michael Redgrave and Nina Foch.

References

Bibliography
 Kabatchnik, Amnon. Blood on the Stage, 1925-1950: Milestone Plays of Crime, Mystery and Detection. Scarecrow Press, 2010.

External links

 
 
1952 Theatre Guild on the Air radio adaptation of original play at Internet Archive

1936 films
1936 crime drama films
American crime drama films
American mystery drama films
American black-and-white films
American films based on plays
Films directed by Sam Wood
Metro-Goldwyn-Mayer films
Films set in London
Films set in Kent
1930s mystery drama films
1930s English-language films
1930s American films